Bisbee Municipal Airport  is  southeast of Bisbee, in Cochise County, Arizona, United States.

Facilities
It has two runways:
 17/35: 5,929 by 60 feet (1,807 x 18 m) asphalt
 2/20: 2,650 by 110 feet (808 x 34 m) dirt

In the year ending April 16, 2008 the airport had 4,900 aircraft operations, average 13 per day, all general aviation.

15 aircraft were then based at this airport: 87% single-engine and 13% ultralight.

References

External links 
 Bisbee Municipal Airport at Arizona DOT Airport Directory

Airports in Cochise County, Arizona